Aspergillus assulatus (also named Neosartorya assulata) is a species of fungus in the genus Aspergillus. It is from the Fumigati section. The species was first described in 2014. It has been reported to produce indole alkaloids and apolar metabolites.

Growth and morphology

A. assulatus has been cultivated on both Czapek yeast extract agar (CYA) plates and Malt Extract Agar Oxoid® (MEAOX) plates. The growth morphology of the colonies can be seen in the pictures below.

References

Further reading 
 

assulatus
Fungi described in 2014